Jesús Díaz may refer to:
 Jesús Díaz (football referee) (born 1954), Colombian football referee
 Jesús Díaz (writer) (1941–2002), Cuban writer
 Jesús González Díaz (born 1994), simply known as Jesús, Spanish footballer
 Jesús Ildefonso Díaz (born 1950), Spanish mathematician
 Jesús Díaz (footballer) (born 2004), Colombian footballer